Chelaru is a surname. Notable people with the surname include:

Diana Chelaru (born 1993), Romanian gymnast
Mircea Chelaru (born 1949), Romanian general and politician
Octav Chelaru (born 1991), Romanian film director and screenwriter
Vasile Chelaru (born 1921), Romanian fencer

See also
 Chela Ruiz (1921–1999), Argentine actress